Sister Mary Prema Pierick, M.C. (born 13 May 1953), is a German-born Indian Catholic  religious sister and the former Superior General of the Missionaries of Charity of Calcutta, India, the religious institute founded by the Saint Mother Teresa of Calcutta. She is of German origin.

Biography
Pierick was born Mechthild Pierick in a farming community in Reken, Germany. In 1980, after reading the biography of the foundress, Something Beautiful for God by Malcolm Muggeridge, she went to meet Mother Teresa in Berlin. She felt called to join her work and moved to India to join the Missionaries.

Pierick eventually became the Regional Superior of the institute for the Sisters in Europe. She returned to India to supervise the tertianship program of the institute, the last stage of training before final religious profession. She succeeded Sister Nirmala Joshi as Superior General on 24 March 2009, heading an organisation which had over 5,000 members worldwide at that time.

References

External links
New head of Mother Teresa order to follow her footsteps, AFP
German-born nun to head Mother Teresa's order, AP

1953 births
Living people
20th-century German Roman Catholic nuns
People who lost German citizenship
People with acquired Indian citizenship
German emigrants to India
People from Borken (district)
Superiors general
21st-century Indian Roman Catholic nuns